Milan Ružić (25 July 1955 in Rijeka, Yugoslavia – 25 January 2014 in Rijeka, Croatia) was a Croatian football player. He was capped twice for Yugoslavia.

Club career
He scored 31 goals in 430 appearances for hometown club Rijeka and also played in Belgium.

International career
Ružić made his debut for Yugoslavia in a March 1983 friendly match away against Romania and earned a total of 2 caps, scoring no goals. His second and final international was a June 1983 friendly against West Germany.

Death and legacy
He died in January 2014 after a long and serious illness.

NK Kraljevica changed the name of their stadium Oštro to Stadium Milan Ružić - Minta in his honour in August 2015.

Career statistics

Club

Honours
NK Rijeka
Yugoslav Cup: 1978, 1979
Balkans Cup: 1978

Individual
Best NK Rijeka player 1978-79, 1980-81, 1982-83
NK Rijeka best left midfielder of all time 
Scorer of the 2500 goal of the Yugoslav First League
HNK Rijeka all time XI by Novi list

References

External links
 
Profile at Serbian federation official site

1955 births
2014 deaths
Footballers from Rijeka
Association football midfielders
Yugoslav footballers
Yugoslavia international footballers
HNK Rijeka players
K. Beringen F.C. players
K.A.A. Gent players
K.R.C. Zuid-West-Vlaanderen players
HSV Hoek players
Yugoslav First League players
Belgian Pro League players
Challenger Pro League players
Yugoslav expatriate footballers
Expatriate footballers in Belgium
Yugoslav expatriate sportspeople in Belgium
Expatriate footballers in the Netherlands
Yugoslav expatriate sportspeople in the Netherlands